The Hai-Genti are a fictional alien species that appear in the game Maelstrom.

History
The species that are known as the Hai-Genti evolved and built a civilization thousands of years before humanity developed society, language or culture. This would all happen on their distant homeworld of Proxima Centauri where they quickly developed a golden age for their race. However, this was not to last, as their rapid growth gradually destroyed the delicate ecological balance of their homeworld. Should a solution not be found then their race would have faced extinction.

Civil war was the result of this discovery which broke out between those that wished to save themselves as a species and those who desired nothing but power and domination. Luckily for the Hai-Genti, the former won the war and attempted to delve into organic forms of technology through gene-engineering in an effort to save their planet. But it was far too late and their world was a dying planet. Instead, the race decided to relocate to a new more prosperous world and discovered one which was known to the natives as Earth.

Background

Biology
The true nature of the Hai-Genti is unknown as their years of engineering their organisms and themselves makes it uncertain what the original race appeared as. An early video trailer of the game revealed a bipedal reptilian looking creature present on the battlefield which may have been what the Hai-Genti themselves appear as.

They were originally not a psionic species but developed this potential through artificial engineered means by the Overseer. This also resulted in the race becoming more akin to a hive mind rather than separate individuals as the psionic abilities allowed each and every Hai-Genti to be linked to one another.

Society
The Hai-Genti as they are currently are far different from what their species were originally. This is because of the years in gene engineering and organic evolution which has, in essence, created a synthetic species that uses living beings as tools for different tasks. The Hai-Genti have become masters in bio-weaponry and its usage in conquering the environment which allows them to use the native flora as well as fauna to their advantage. This was all done so in an effort to achieve a single racial goal - survival of their kind.

Due to their extensive use of living technology, the Hai-Genti require a high use of water which is a vital requirement for their roles. So much so that their battle tactics revolve around using techniques such as flooding a region to ensure that they achieve an advantage over the native Humans, who they see as a lesser species and unworthy of control of their planet.

Leadership

Overseer
The Overseer is  essentially the heart of the Hai-Genti race and serves as a powerful intelligence that guides the race in their invasion of Earth. The creature, like most of their races technology, is a living breathing entity and was one of the first creations of their kind. The Overseer is, in essence, an organic super computer that was created to aid in the engineering of other races and appears as a large mound of translucent brain tissue that pulses with bio-processing fluid.

The Overseer was responsible for discovering the secrets of psionic potential and unlocked it in the Hai-Genti's genetic code allowing them to use such abilities. This had the added benefit of linking the entire species and their creations into a single group mind.

Though the creature is not immortal, it is impervious to the effects of time and is able to upload its consciousness to a new body thanks to the psionic network it developed. This had the added benefit of the Overseer achieving a sense of wisdom through its experience and the memories of the many ages it lived through. It is a result of this vital role it plays within its society that prevents it from being on the front line and is always found hidden in its protective shelter where it guides and advises the Hai-Genti's forces.

Mammon
Mammon was a scientist on the Hai-Genti homeworld and was the first to discover that their planet was dying. It was also Mammon who led a group of like-minded intellects in their attempt to warn their people of this approaching disaster. Despite his efforts, he faced much opposition from the warlord Auriga, who controlled a fourth of the planet. This eventually led to battle between the two as well as civil war which lasted for many years with countless lives being lost but in the end, Auriga was defeated.  

Mammon then focused his efforts in attempting a rebirth of the Hai-Genti homeworld through the use of bio-engineering of various life forms, as well as his race themselves, but it was far too late. It was thus decided by the race that they would find a new homeworld and Mammon would be the first who willingly uploaded his mind into the psychic buffers on board the starship Caucus.

Auriga
An ancient cruel and malicious dictator who was a mighty warlord on the Hai-Genti homeworld. Auriga controlled more than one fourth of the planet in his time with his bloodlust and acts of wanton destruction making him a feared and dangerous opponent to face. His reign would slowly come to an end when he made war against Mammon who advocated in attempting to save their homeworld.
 
Civil war was the result which would end in Auriga's defeat and the simple choice of surrendering or dying. He decided to surrender but vowed to kill Mammon when the opportunity arose for the transgressions he made against the warlord. When the Hai-Genti homeworld was abandoned for a more prosperous planet, Auriga downloaded his mind into the psychic buffers of the Hai-Genti starship Caucus. For centuries his mind has remained there, growing in anger and greed while awaiting the opportune moment to strike against his enemy - Mammon.

Psyclade
A special servant of the Overseer that floats above the ground. The Psyclade is a psychic Hai-Genti that can manipulate organic matter with a simple glance or a mere thought. It is possible the Overseer copied its ability to erect a force field from this organic form, as the Psyclade Hai-Genti can create a force field, as well as send a shockwave through the ground surrounding it. Its one and only purpose is to serve the Overseer, and it will die trying to accomplish this goal.

Technology
The Hai-Genti are one of the few races that have developed a completely different approach in the way of technology. This is entirely based on living creatures constructed through sophisticated biological engineering which serve a variety of purposes from beasts of burden to war organisms. As such, these creatures are capable of remarkable feats from simple melee strikes to kill enemies to energy weapons being generated to destroy enemy vehicles.

The race has also developed the ability to travel the stars as evidenced by their mothership the Caucus which sends spores down to the planet they are conquering in an effort to aid in the terraforming of the world.

List of Organisms
Progenitor - a large slow moving beast that commands a colony of smaller subterranean beasts to attack its enemies. It can later be 'upgraded' to utilise a worm-like appendage for long strikes against enemy forces.
Scuttler - bio-engineered as a suicide unit, the scuttler is fast and dies when it explodes within enemy lines. It can be later 'upgraded' to either leave behind slime that slows down enemy units exposed to it or a deadly acid that slowly burns them to death.
Salamander - a large lumbering beast that breathes out fire that burns its enemies to death and can be modified to increase the strength of this biological flame to deal even more damage.
Scorpion - a creature whose sting located on its tail can turn humans into alien spawns that turned against their comrades. They can be 'upgraded' to launch biological incendiary bombs at long range.
Crusher - a large beast that uses its jaws and arms to destroy its enemies and can breathe a deadly acid on its enemies which burns anything it comes into contact with. 
Raptor - a flying organism that is armed through a biologically generated energy beam that destroys enemy units or buildings. The manner this is generated is unknown.
Pestilence - a larger flying organism that protects itself through a swarm of leech-like creatures that attacks its enemies. They can later be 'upgraded' to create a warp and teleport to a different location through biological means but how this is accomplished is unknown.
Bio-Thrall - humans who have been modified with Hai-Genti DNA and, as such, have become mindless drones to their masters. They can transform themselves into a sort of living proximity mine.
Spawn - the basic type of Hai-Genti warrior who are bred in large numbers to defeat their enemies and use organic blades attached to their bodies.
Ripper - a breed of Hai-Genti not unlike the Spawn, Rippers can attack by launching the spikes on their backs at their foes.
Siren - another basic Hai-Genti organism. The Sirens attack by using sonic waves to damage their foes via screeching at high frequencies.
Psyclade - a special organism that resides on the Mothership until called down. The Psyclade is capable of transforming its enemies into Spawns, and when it has been 'upgraded' through combat experience, it can also erect a force field around its body and create a shockwave that pulses through the ground around it.
Titan - the largest and most powerful organism the Hai-Genti have. The Titan is a creature of colossal size. In fact, it is so big it must be called down from the Mothership among flame and smoke. Its sheer size enables it to crush its foes, and it also has a poison breath that burns the skin of its opponents.
Devourer - a four-armed biped organism twice the size of a human. It can attack by grabbing its foes in its powerful claws, then devouring them.

Inception Spores
The main hub for all Hai-Genti activities. When they first arrived on Earth, Mammon, Auriga and the Overseer had a discussion on their methods of how to take over Earth in the first Inception Spore. Mammon has the authority to call a new Inception Spore from the Mothership. The Inception Spores are always seen near a Biomass Farm, and are usually surrounded by Hai-Genti.

Biomass Farms
Built over Survivor Compounds, where humans have taken refuge, Biomass Compounds produce Bio-Thralls by mutating the humans it was built over and releasing them once transformed. Biomass Farms are always seen near an Inception Spore, and can mainly be expected to be surrounded by Bio-Thralls.

Giant Alienoid Worm
A special breed of Hai-Genti that live underground. While normally they cannot be beamed down from the Mothership, it is possible to summon them from their earthy home with a Progenitor. Once released, the great worm bursts from the ground in a spray of dirt and rock, attacking all who oppose it. However, its eyes are very weak from living under the ground, and it soon burrows back down into the welcome darkness, giving the enemy a final attack by spraying them with acid slime.

Eggs
The objects which all Hai-Genti life forms hatch from. Eggs are beamed down from the Mothership, where the contents of the egg is then released to serve the Overseer. The larger the creature, the larger the egg must be. This explains why the Titan is released as it is: no egg could contain its massive body.

External links
http://uk.pc.ign.com/articles/717/717248p1.html
http://uk.pc.ign.com/articles/726/726613p1.html

Fictional extraterrestrial life forms
Fiction set around Proxima Centauri